Megalopyge lampra is a moth of the family Megalopygidae. It was described by Harrison Gray Dyar Jr. in 1910.

References

Moths described in 1910
Megalopygidae